Moral police is an umbrella category of vigilante groups which act to enforce a code of morality in India. Some of India's laws, and some actions of police forces in India are also considered to be instances of moral policing. The target of moral policing is any activity that vigilante groups, the government or police deem to be "immoral" and/or "against Indian culture".

Overview

India has several vigilante groups that claim to protect the Indian culture. They resist and oppose cultural concepts that they deem to have been imported from the Western culture. They have been known to attack bars and pubs. Some of these groups have attacked or have forced to shut down art exhibitions, where they claim obscene paintings were being displayed. They have issued diktats against western attires. Some have also condemned beauty parlours. Some members of the media have also colluded with such groups. Some politicians have supported such viewpoints and occasionally such activities.

Laws
In India, the Sections 292 to 294 of the Indian Penal Code are used to deal with obscenity. Most of these laws date back to 1860. The Section 292 of the Indian Penal Code deals with sales and distribution of obscene books and other material. It criminalises materials like books and paintings if it is deemed to be "lascivious or appeals to the prurient interest". The Section 292 was amended in 1969 to exclude material that are for public good (like condom ads), scientific material, art and religious figures. Police also use Section 292 of the IPC to file cases against film posters and advertisement hoardings that are deemed to be "obscene".

The Section 293 deals with the sale of obscene material to people under 20. The Section 294 of the Indian Penal Code deals with "obscene acts and songs" and it states that:

There is no proper definition of an obscene act and it is open to interpretation. It is frequently used by the police to justify acts of moral policing.

Immoral Traffic (Prevention) Act, 1956 (also known as Prevention of Immoral Traffic Act or PITA) was originally passed to prevent human trafficking. It allows police to raid hotels if they suspect a sex racket is being run there. Police have used this law to raid hotels and arrest consenting couples.

India's obscenity laws have also been frequently compared to the Hicklin test.

Valentine's Day

Valentine's Day is often opposed by groups like Shiv Sena and the moral police for being a western import. Vigilante groups have been known to attack gift and greeting card shops prior on the occasion. Couples are often beaten up for holding hands or kissing in public.

Shiv Sena leader Uddhav Thackeray has called it an attack of the west on Indian culture and that it is attracting youth for commercial gain. Shiv Sena's former leader Bal Thackeray has said that people not wanting violence on the day should not celebrate it. He has also called the festival shameless and contrary to Indian culture. Occasionally, the police also try to restrict these groups but even though their activities flourish 'til the date.

Incidents of moral policing

By vigilante groups, religious organizations and unaffiliated citizens
 In the early 1990s, an Islamic women's separatist organization called Dukhtaran-e-Millat in Jammu and Kashmir began forcing local women to cover their faces and threatening them with acid attacks. During the period, they also attacked cinemas, video parlours, beauty parlours and wine shops. In 2005, they attacked hotel bars and restaurants, and destroyed liquor bottles.
 In 1996, a Hindi magazine Vichar Mimansa published an article titled "M. F. Husain: A Painter or a Butcher?" which contained reprints of paintings M. F. Husain had created in 1975. They depicted various Hindu goddesses in nude or copulating poses. Eight different lawsuits were filed against him. In 2008, the Delhi High Court quashed three cases which had been transferred to it.
 The 1996 Miss World pageant was held in Bangalore. It faced criticism from protestors who claimed that event was demeaning women and India's culture. Several self-immolation threats were made. The police arrest 1,500 protestors, including several from the BJP. One man died in a self-immolation attempt. Among other organizations which had protested the event were: Karnataka Rajya Raitha Sangha and Communist Party of India. 
 In 1997, a lawyer named Sabu Thomas from Kerala filed an obscenity case against the author Arundhati Roy, claiming that the 21st chapter of The God of Small Things contains obscene scenes. The book was also criticized by politician E. M. S. Namboodiripad.
 In May 2005, Nationalist Congress Party (NCP) workers stormed a pub in Pune, Maharashtra, broke window panes, and damaged furniture. The move came days after Pune Police had forced five pubs to shut before the closing time of 12:30 am.
 In September 2005, Tamil actress Khushbu said during an interview with a magazine that it was fine for girls to indulge in pre-marital sex as long as they took precautions against diseases and pregnancies. Various political parties, notably Pattali Makkal Katchi and Dalit Panthers of India, took offence at the statement. They claimed that the comment "denigrates the chastity of Tamil Women" and over 20 lawsuits were filed against the actress in the state of Tamil Nadu. During a hearing in November, protestors hurled eggs, rotten tomatoes and slippers at her car. In April 2010, the Supreme Court of India dropped all 23 defamation cases against her.
 In September 2005, a fatwa against tennis player Sania Mirza was issued by a cleric named Haseeb-ul-hasan Siddiqui of the Sunni Ulema Board. The fatwa said that her attire on the tennis court and billboard advertisements were un-Islamic. Mirza later decided to hire bodyguards.
 In September 2005, a court in Rajasthan fined an Israeli couple  for kissing during their wedding ceremony. The couple had decided to get married in a Hindu ceremony at Pushkar Lake. However, the priests were offended when the couple started kissing and hugging during the ceremony, and filed a lawsuit.
 In December 2006, an obscenity case was filed against Rajasthan Chief Minister Vasundhara Raje and Biocon India Chief Kiran Mazumdar-Shaw for allegedly kissing at a public function. The lawsuit came after newspapers published the pictures of a cheek-to-cheek air kiss from a peculiar angle.
 2008 Imphal bombing: In October 2008, an explosion occurred at Ragailong, a tribal village near Imphal where people had gathered to play a traditional gambling game. Seventeen people were killed, and many more injured, in the blast. The Kangleipak Communist Party (Military Council) claimed responsibility for the blast, stating they wanted to stop the game because it "affects Manipuri culture adversely".
2009 Mangalore pub attack: On 24 January 2009, members of the Sri Ram Sena barged into the pub "Amnesia – The Lounge" in Mangalore, Karnataka, and beat up a group of young women and men, claiming the women should not be drinking in a public place.
 In December 2011, Vinay Rai, the editor of a Delhi-based Urdu daily called Akbari, filed an obscenity case against 21 websites including Facebook, Yahoo and Google, for allegedly distributing obscene material. The companies appealed the Delhi High Court to drop the case, but the Delhi HC on 13 January allowed the case to proceed.
2012 Mangalore homestay attack: On 28 July 2012, activists belonging to the Hindu Jagarana Vedike attacked a birthday party at an unlicensed homestay in Mangalore, Karnataka. The 12 people at the party, including 5 girls, were allegedly beaten, stripped and molested. The faces of some girls were blackened. The activists claimed the youngsters were consuming alcohol and were involved in "some indecent activities".
 In February 2013, three girls who were members of a rock band in Jammu and Kashmir began receiving threats and hate messages on the internet. Later, the Grand Mufti of Kashmir, Bashir-ud-din Farooqi, issued a fatwa against them, asking them to stop such immoral activities. Ayaz Akbar, the spokesperson of All Parties Hurriyat Conference said that western culture had no place in the Kashmir valley, and Dukhtaran-e-Millat also supported the fatwa. Later, the girls shut down the band.
 On March 8, 2017 Moral policing happened in marine drive Kochi against the kiss of love activists. As the ‘moral police’ unleashed attack on a few couples who were reluctant to disperse, about 20 other couples present at the spot fled in scare. ‘‘Some of the couples were seen pleading to let them go. But the group abused some of the females and cane-charged them,’’ said an eyewitness.
 On 23 October 2014, a restaurant in Kozhikode was attacked and vandalised. The attackers claimed that eatery was facilitating immoral activities. The attack came after a local Malayalam-language TV channel broadcast a report claiming that some coffee shops and restaurants in Kozhikode had become centres of "immoral activities". 
 On February 19, 2020 a man was attacked in Kochi by three people while he was riding on a motorcycle with his wife. The three people hit the man and he became unconscious. Police later arrested three of the culprits. 
 On 14 July 2015, a Madhyamam Daily journalist and her husband were attacked by a group at her office. They did not accept that they were married. The police arrived before the incident escalated. Later, a Communist Party of India (Marxist) leader was arrested for leading the attack.

By police
 In October 1993, Mumbai police began arresting street-hawkers selling girlie magazines. The publishers of Debonair issued a letter to retailers declaring that their magazine was not banned. They petitioned Bombay High Court against seizures of its issues. Another magazine, Chastity, delayed its November issue until it could acquire legal support against seizures.
 In September 2000, Mumbai police banned kissing in the Marine Drive area. They cited the Section of 110 Mumbai Police Act, 1951 which allows the police to interfere in "disorderly behaviour." The decree was later withdrawn after protests.
 In September 2005, the license of a Chennai night club was suspended by the police, after photographs of some couples kissing were published by two newspapers, Tamil Murasu and Dinamalar. The reason for the license suspension was given that the club served alcohol after midnight. Following the incident, several clubs and bars in the city banned cellphones with cameras.
 On 19 December 2005, police personnel raided a public park in Meerut, accompanied by cameras crews from TV channels. They attacked couples sitting in the park in front of cameras. The raid was termed "Operation Majnu" (named after the folklore) and it was claimed by the police that the purpose was to check sexual harassment.
 In November 2006, police raided a trance music festival in Ramgarh near Jaipur after local complained about alcohol, drug and sex. They also said that the laser lights at the venue were disturbing the local wildlife.
 In September 2008, a policeman in Delhi filed a case of obscenity against a married couple for kissing in the Dwarka court complex. The couple appealed in the Delhi High Court. The Court noted that even though the charge-sheet claimed that the case was filed because the passerby were feeling bad, no one was mentioned by name.  The Court said that kissing in public by married couples cannot be termed obscene. The Court passed its verdict on 25 May 2009 and asked the police to drop the case against the couple. The police was asked to pay  to both husband and wife.
 In January 2008, the police from D.N. Nagar of Mumbai arrested a Belgian fashion photographer named Vandelanotte Gaetan for taking nude pictures of two Indian models, Tushar Narvekar and Nitin Gupta. A court discharged him in March 2009 saying a laptop is akin to a personal diary and photos stored on it cannot used as evidence of obscenity.
 In August 2008, 22 customs officers were arrested from a party at a bungalow near Lonavla. They were allegedly watching porn on a laptop and were undressed. The police also arrested 10 girls and a husband-wife duo. The Mumbai High Court dropped the case in September 2010 stating watching pornography in a private residence is not an offence.
 On 29 November 2011, the Ghaziabad police launched its own "Operation Majnu". The police caught couples in parks and made the men do sit-ups in front of TV cameras. The head of the operation an officer called Alka Pandey said it was to prevent "innocent girls being trapped by boys with evil motives".
 In 2012, Assistant Police Commissioner Vasant Dhoble carried out a series of raids on bars and clubs in and around Mumbai, claiming to rescue prostitutes. In one instance, he labelled four German women wrongly as sex workers in front of cameras when he arrested them on 30 March 2014 from the Voodoo pub. On 5 June 2012, Dhoble raided Masala Curry restaurant after he felt suspicious of women being allowed free entry. Two cousins who were picked up in the raid later filed a defamation case against Dhoble.
 On 10 August 2013, Ghaziabad police raided a hotel on a tip-off and detained 56 adult couples. It was later found out of them, 52 couples were married or consenting friends. The police had carried out the raid after locals noticed usual traffic to the hotel and told the police.
 Following the gang rape of a photojournalist in Mumbai in August 2013, Mumbai Police Commissioner Satyapal Singh was severely criticized by the public for defending moral policing. The Commissioner was quoted to have said, "On the one hand you want to have a promiscuous culture and on the other hand you want a safe and secure environment for the people."
 Hyderabad Police raided a gay party at a club in the city on 3 September 2013. The police defended that raid under the Sector 294 of IPC that it was obscenity in a public place and that bar was serving alcohol after closing time. LGBT activists denounced the raid as "a classic example of moral policing" and discrimination against the LGBT community.
 On 14 February 2014, the police in Gokarna attacked a party of about 200 foreigners with sticks. The police claimed that the party was going on after established time limit. The victims alleged that initially the police had demanded bribes to let the party continue, but attacked them after they refused. A petition was sent to various embassies to interfere in the matter.
 On 6 August 2015, Malwani police in Mumbai, raided hotels and guest houses near Aksa Beach and Madh Island, and detained about 40 couples. Most of them were consenting couples in private rooms, but they were charged under Section 110 (Indecent behaviour in public) of the Bombay Police Act and fined . Only three cases were filed under Prevention of Immoral Traffic Act. Later, Mumbai Police Commissioner Rakesh Maria order an inquiry into the raids.

By the Central and state governments

Central Board of Film Certification

The Central Board of Film Certification (CBFC) or the Censor Board, which is tasked with regulating the public exhibition of films under the provisions of the "Cinematograph Act, 1952", has been accused of moral policing by some filmmakers. Director Anurag Kashyap has argued that it is infeasible to have a single body for a large and diverse country like India. Director Prakash Jha has pointed out that even if a film is certified by the Board, it is often not allowed a release in some states due to protests from local political parties or moral police. He has also said that the Board should be scrapped and each film-maker should simply state the type of content in the film because the society is mature enough to understand it. Sudhir Mishra has noted that censor committees have been influenced to giving films lighter ratings.

The former chief of the Censor Board, Sharmila Tagore, has defended the body saying that it does not carried out moral policing. In August 2014, then chief of the Censor Board, Rakesh Kumar, was arrested for allegedly delaying certifications to films and demanding bribes to speed up the process.

Restrictions on night life and alcohol

Throughout India, restrictions have been place by some state governments on timings for pubs, bars and other establishments that sell liquor.

 The 2005 ban on dance bars in Maharashtra was considered to be an act of moral policing. Prior to the ban, the state government had claimed that the bars had a "corrupting influence on youth and compromised the moral standards of local men". As a result of the ban thousands of women employed by the 750 bars in the state lost their jobs and many were forced into prostitution. In June 2011, the state raised the legal age of drinking to 25, from previous 21. Furthermore, an old law called "Bombay Prohibition of Foreign Liquor Act, 1949", mandates anyone seeking to buy, possess or consume alcohol to obtain a special permit.
 The state of Karnataka has a law dating back to 1967, called Rule 11(1) of the "Karnataka Excise Licences Rules of 1967", which prohibits dancing in establishments which serve alcohol. In July 2014, the Karnataka High Court asked the government of amend the law, stating that it was unconstitutional as it violated the Freedom of Expression. This law had been used by the local police to ban dancing in bars and clubs, especially in Bangalore.

Opposition to sex education in schools

The Adolescence Education Programme (AEP) was a sex education program designed by the Ministry of Human Resource Development (India) and National AIDS Control Organisation (NACO) to implement the policies of the National AIDS Control Programme II (NACP II). However, it faced opposition in various states, including Gujarat, Madhya Pradesh, Maharashtra, Karnataka, and Rajasthan.

 In February 2007, Gujarat government in a press release stated that it would not be introducing sex education in the state. It stated that the books suggested in the program by the Central government were inappropriate for children. However, in April 2010, it reintroduced sex education in a diluted form.
 In March 2007, Maharashtra government banned sex education in schools. The ban came after the ruling and opposition Members of the Legislative Assembly protested in the state assembly claiming that western countries had forced the Central government to implement the program.
 In April 2007, the Karnataka Minister for Primary and Secondary Education Basavaraj Horatti said that the program has been put on hold after complaints from teachers. The teachers had complained that the books was oriented towards increasing the sales of condoms, and that the illustrations were against Indian culture and sexually provocative.
 In May 2007, Madhya Pradesh Chief Minister Shivraj Singh Chouhan banned sex education in schools claiming that sex education has no place in Indian culture.
 In May 2007, Rajasthan Chief Minister Vasundhara Raje wrote a letter to Arjun Singh, then Union Minister of Human Resource Development. In the letter, she stated that children in Class IX and XI, at whom the course was directed, do not require sex education as they are in the early stages of puberty. The state Education Minister Ghansyam Tiwari stated that they already had a life skills course called Jeevan Shaili, and sex education will have a negative impact on young minds.

Others
 In 2016, a man was killed in Mankada, Malappuram, Kerala for visiting his girlfriend in the night. The victim was a 42-year-old man called Nazeer from the same locality.  Around three in the morning some of his neighbors spotted him in a house where a woman was living alone.  They attacked him and killed as an act of moral policing.  Kerala police have arrested three persons in connection with this incident.  
 In 1996, it was announced by a Chandigarh-based company Global Internet Ltd. that an adult entertainment pay channel called Plus 21 would be launched in India. In response to this, the National Commission for Women (NCW) filed a lawsuit in the Delhi High Court. NCW claimed that it was performing its stipulated functions of protecting the interests of women and preventing culture shock to viewers. NCW was represented by notable feminist lawyer Indira Jaising. NCW claimed that channel would be showing pornography which would violate Indecent Representation of Women (Prohibition) Act 1986. The argument also cited the Indian Telegraph Act, 1885. The High Court put an injunction against the launch of the channel.
 In the 2001, the Information and Broadcasting ministry banned two television channels TB6 and Fashion TV.
 In December 2000, after Priyanka Chopra was crowned Miss World, beauty contests were banned in her home state of Uttar Pradesh under the orders of then Chief Minister Rajnath Singh. He claimed that beauty contests were against traditional culture and were vulgar. Akhil Bharatiya Vidyarthi Parishad praised the ban.
 In 2003, Union Information and Broadcasting Minister Sushma Swaraj removed condom ads, funded by National AIDS Control Organisation (NACO), from public broadcasting channel Doordarshan.
 In January 2007, the Information and Broadcasting ministry banned the TV channel AXN for two months. The channel was allegedly adversely affecting public morality by broadcasting a show called 'World's Sexiest Commercials' after 11 pm.
 In March 2007, Ministry of Information and Broadcasting banned Fashion TV for two months for broadcasting programs that were capable of corrupting public morality.
 In June 2009, the Ministry of Communications and Information Technology issued a notice to various internet service providers and directed them to block the pornographic webcomic called Savita Bhabhi.
 In March 2013, the Ministry of Communications and Information Technology ordered Fashion TV to be taken off air for 10 days, for violating the Cable Television Networks Rules, 1994. The government claimed the channel was showing obscene and vulgar visuals which were unsuitable for the public and children. This was the 3rd time the channel was ordered to go off-air.
 In May 2014, the Ministry of Communications and Information Technology suspended the TV channel Comedy Central for 10 days. The ministry claimed that Comedy Central had violated Cable Television Networks Regulation Act, 1995, by showing shows which were obscene and denigrated women. In November 2014, Delhi High Court upheld the government's order. By this time, the channel had gone off air for 4 days. They had appealed in the court claiming that their right to broadcast was protected under Article 19 of the Constitution. However, later in the same month the Supreme Court stayed the order and allowed further hearing.
 In March 2015, local authorities in the Malda district of West Bengal cancelled a women's football match, featuring national team players, between a Kolkata side and a North Bengal team in March 2015. The order came after Muslim residents and local maulvis objected to women playing sports. Biplab Roy, the Block Development Officer (BDO) of Harishchandrapur, Malda explained, "When I came to know about the local opposition, I referred the matter to the SP and the DM, and the local police station. The order came from the top that the match should be cancelled, and I acted accordingly in the interest of peace and tranquillity and public order."

Accusations of obscenity against actors and film-makers
 In 1993, during Nelson Mandela's visit to India, he kissed actress Shabana Azmi on the cheek. The incident created a controversy and drew criticism from the Muslim community.
 In 1995, an obscenity case was filed against model-turned actor Milind Soman and Madhu Sapre for posing nude in a shoe advertisement. They were acquitted by a Mumbai court in December 2009. The court said that what may consider obscene for one, may not be so for others.
 In February 2000, a Mumbai court heard an obscenity case against actresses, Pooja Bhatt, Madhuri Dixit, Mamta Kulkarni, Karisma Kapoor, Tabassum Hashmi, Raveena Tandon and Juhi Chawla. The main complainant in the case was Archana Chavan, head of the Baroda-based Nari Shakti Sanghatna. She claimed that the actresses were corrupting Indian culture. The court dropped the case stating the allegation of obscenity were vague.
 In July 2000, an obscenity case against Mamta Kulkarni was heard in a Mumbai court. She was accused of posing obscenely on the cover of magazine called Stardust in 1993.
 In January 2005, a case was filed against Pooja Bhatt, the director of a film called Rog. The complainant was a St Xavier's College lecturer, Pratibha Naithani, who considered the posters of film obscene. The case was dropped in 2008 by a Bandra court. But it was reopened in 2011, after the petition of one Vinod Jain. In November 2012, the Bombay High Court dropped the case.
 In 2006, a Madurai-based lawyer, Dakshninammorthy, filed a case against actress Shilpa Shetty and Reema Sen, under Section 109 of the Indian Penal Code, Prevention of Publication of Obscene Pictures Act and Section 3 of the Young Persons (Harmful Publications) Act. The lawsuit came in response to some photographs published in a newspaper called Tamil Murasu. The petitioner claimed that the pictures polluted the minds of the youth. The court had issued non-bailable warrants against the actresses. On 23 April 2008, the Madras High Court dropped that case against the two actress, but however added that the case could be continued against the publishers.
 In May 2006, a case filed against item girl Rakhi Sawant after a live-performance for "indecent behaviour" and "destroying public peace" under Section 110, 112, 117 of the Bombay Police Act, 1951. The organizer was also indicted in the case.
 In 2006, Shailendra Dwivedi, an Indore-based lawyer, filed an obscenity case against actors Aishwarya Rai and Hrithik Roshan for kissing in the movie Dhoom 2. The lawyer claimed that the scene was vulgar and couldn't be watched by Indian families. A separate case had been filed by a Muzaffarpur-based lawyer named Sudhir Kumar Ojha.
 In January 2007, Vinod Jain tried to file an obscenity case against actress Mallika Sherawat in the Santacruz police station after watching the telecast of a New Year's performance on television. The police examined the footage and decided not file a case after pointing out that Sherawat was wearing a skin-coloured suit. However, later a Bandra court had accepted the petition. In June 2007, Narendra Tiwari, the President of the Baroda bar association, filed an obscenity case against her for the same performance. In January 2011, Sherawat was acquitted in one of the cases but Vinod Jain said that he will appeal in the Mumbai High Court. In the other case, Sherawat appealed to the Gujarat High Court to drop the case, but the Court rejected the appeal on 2 March 2013. On 16 August 2013, the Supreme Court of India stayed the proceedings on appeal.
 Shilpa Shetty and Richard Gere kissing incident: In April 2007, effigies of Hollywood actor Richard Gere and Bollywood actress Shilpa Shetty were burnt after Gere kissed Shetty on the cheek at an AIDS awareness function in Delhi, and a Rajasthan court ordered Gere's arrest on obscenity charges. The lawsuit had been filed by a lawyer named Poonam Chand Bhandari claimed to have been annoyed by the obscene act. Former Attorney General Soli Sorabjee described the court order as reminiscent of the "Taliban moral police". In April 2008, the Supreme Court of India dropped the arrest warrant against Gere and said that he is free to enter and leave India anytime. In November 2011, the Supreme Court shifted the case against Shetty to a Mumbai court.
 In 2009, an obscenity case was filed against actor Akshay Kumar and his wife Twinkle Khanna by an activist named Anil Nair. During a fashion show in Mumbai, Kumar had allegedly walked down the ramp and asked his wife who was seated in the front to unbutton his jeans.
 In 2009, Rajnikant Borile, a social worker, filed an obscenity case against Mallika Sherawat in Yavatmal, claiming she had performed obscene acts in her various films which affected the society and the younger generation.
 In December 2011, a Nampally-based lawyer Sai Krishna Azad filed an obscenity case against actress Vidya Balan. According to him, poster and advesitisement of the film The Dirty Picture, starring Balan, were spoiling the minds of people and causing harm to the society. The court accepted petition, it directed police to book Balan and take action against the posters.
 On 2 February 2015, Akhilesh Tiwari, president of Brahman Ekta Seva Sanstha filed a complaint against film-maker Karan Johar, and actors Arjun Kapoor and Ranveer Singh in Mumbai. They claimed that they had appeared in a YouTube comedy channel's roast event held in December 2014, All India Bakchod Knockout, whose videos were uploaded to the internet. The complaint accused the three of using filthy language. The Maharashtra government also ordered an inquiry. The video removed from on 3 February by the channel. Later, in a separate complaint filed by one Wazir Shaikh in Pune, accusations against 14 people were included. It named Deepika Padukone, who was kissed by Ranveer Singh. Sonakshi Sinha was also named in it. YouTube was accused of distributing the obscene content. The charges filed were Indian Penal Code Section 292 (distribution of obscene content) and Section 294 (obscene act in public place); and Section 67a of IT Act (transmitting of material containing sexually explicit act in electronic form).

Other
 Some colleges and universities enforce a dress code on their students, usually restricting girls from wearing Western clothing. The rationale behind such restriction has been that such clothes attract "eve-teasing".

Protests against moral policing

In 2009, following the 2009 Mangalore pub attack, an organisation called "Consortium of Pubgoing, Loose Forward Women" started a movement called the "Pink chaddi campaign". The movement requested people to mail pink underwear to Pramod Muthalik the leader of Sri Ram Sena which was behind the attacks. About 34,000 people participated.

In the state of Kerala, a public hugging and kissing campaign by name 'Kiss of Love' was launched in protest against moral policing on 2 November 2014. Similar events were later organized in Delhi, Kolkata, and various other cities.

See also
 Nanny state
 Pink chaddi campaign
 2014 Kiss of Love protest
 List of books banned in India
 List of films banned in India
 Vigilante attacks in Kerala

References

Violence against women in India
Conservatism in India
Crime in India
Vigilantes